UTX (Universal Terminology eXchange) is a simple glossary format. UTX is developed by AAMT (Asia-Pacific Association for Machine Translation).  

A tab-separated text format that contains minimal information, such as source language entry, target language entry, and part-of-speech entry. UTX is intended to facilitate rapid creation and quick exchanges of human-readable and machine-readable glossaries. 

Initially, UTX was created to absorb the differences between various user dictionary formats for machine translation. The  scope of the format was later expanded to include other purposes, such as glossaries for human translations, natural language processing, thesaurus, text-to-speech, input method, etc. 

UTX could be used to improve the efficiency of localization for open source projects.

UTX Converter 

UTX Converter was developed as an open source project by AAMT. UTX Converter is available for free.

It has the following functions:
 Functions for UTX
 The format check of a UTX file (UTX 1.11)
 Extraction of forbidden terms
 Extraction of the pairs of forbidden terms and approved terms
 Extraction of the pairs of non-standard terms and approved terms
 Conversion function
 Conversion between UTX and a user dictionary (*. txt file) of ATLAS (Fujitsu)
 Conversion between UTX and a user dictionary (*. txt file) of The Honyaku (Toshiba)
 Conversion between UTX and a user dictionary (*.opt file for EJ, *.dic file for JE) of PC/MED/PAT/Legal Transer (Cross Language)
 Conversion from UTX to a text for MultiTerm import

See also
TBX
Translation memory
Terminology
Computer-assisted translation

External links 
 UTX Home 
 UPF Home (A predecessor to UTX, in Japanese)
 UTX mailing list 
 Glossary Markup Language (GlossML) An open XML format for storing glossaries.

Computer-assisted translation